Pantagruel is a novel by the French satirist François Rabelais.

Pantagruel may also refer to:

 Pantagruel (ensemble), a music ensemble